Dr. Che Rosli bin Che Mat (born 16 July 1951) is a Malaysian politician. He was the Member of the Parliament of Malaysia for the Hulu Langat constituency in Selangor for two terms (2008-2018). He is a member of the Pan-Malaysian Islamic Party (PAS).

Che Rosli was elected to Parliament in the 2008 election, winning the seat of Hulu Langat, which had previously been held by the ruling Barisan Nasional coalition. He defended the seat in the 2013 election successfully with an even bigger majority. However, in the 2018 election, he failed to defend his parliamentary seat, garnering only 17.75% of the votes cast. In the 2004 election, he contested but lost the seat of Simpang Empat in the State Assembly of Perlis.

Before entering politics, Che Rosli was a lecturer in nuclear science.

Election results

References

Living people
1951 births
People from Perlis
Malaysian people of Malay descent
Malaysian Muslims
Malaysian Islamic Party politicians
Members of the Dewan Rakyat
21st-century Malaysian politicians